The Royal Household Long and Faithful Service Medal is a civil decoration awarded by the British monarch to servants of the royal household for long and faithful service.

History
The Royal Household Long and Faithful Service Medal was established by Queen Victoria in 1872 for servants of the British royal household in recognition of their long and faithful service. It was originally awarded for 25 years' cumulative service, with a clasp awarded for each additional 10 years of service.

The service time required was lowered to 20 years' cumulative service by King George V. The dates of the original 20 years' service are engraved on the arms of the suspension bar of the medal. Modern versions of the medal have the name of the recipient engraved on the rim of the medal.

On versions of the medal instituted since King George V the obverse depicts the profile of the reigning monarch and the reverse has the inscription "FOR LONG AND FAITHFUL SERVICE". The design of the ribbon changes depending on the reigning monarch.

In the Order of Wear it falls between the Queen Elizabeth II Platinum Jubilee Medal and the Meritorious Service Medal.

Recipients
Notable recipients of the Royal Household Long and Faithful Service Medal include:

Queen Victoria version

King Edward VII version

George V version

George VI version

Elizabeth II version

References

External links
Image
Image

Civil awards and decorations of the United Kingdom
Long and Meritorious Service Medals of Britain and the Commonwealth